The Assamese Calendar is a solar calendar, followed in the Indian state of Assam. The New Year in the Assamese calendar is known as Bohag Bihu. The calendar is counted from the date of the  ascension of Kumar Bhashkar Barman to the throne of Kamarupa. It differs 593 years with Gregorian calendar.

Months

Days
The Assamese Calendar incorporates the seven-day week as used by many other calendars. The names of the days of the week in the Assamese Calendar are based on the Navagraha ( nowogroho). The day begins and ends at sunrise in the Assamese calendar, unlike in the Gregorian calendar, where the day starts at midnight.

See also
 Manipuri calendar
 Tripuri calendar

References

Lunisolar calendars
Calendar eras
Hindu calendar
Time in India